Belinda Bencic and Kristina Mladenovic were the defending champions, but chose not to participate this year.

Monica Niculescu and Yanina Wickmayer won the title, defeating Shuko Aoyama and Risa Ozaki in the final, 6–4, 6–3.

Seeds
The top three seeds received a bye into the quarterfinals.

Draw

References
Draw

Citi Open - Women's Doubles